35th Reconnaissance Squadron may refer to:
 The 424th Bombardment Squadron, designated the 35th Reconnaissance Squadron (Heavy) in April 1942.  
 The 35th Reconnaissance Squadron (Fighter), active from April 1943 to September 1943, but apparently never fully manned or equipped.

See also
 The 35th Photographic Reconnaissance Squadron